Cunk on Earth is a British mockumentary television series produced by Charlie Brooker. The series stars Diane Morgan as Philomena Cunk, an ill-informed investigative reporter, a character who previously starred on Charlie Brooker's Weekly Wipe and Cunk on Britain. The series was acclaimed by critics, with many praising Morgan's deadpan delivery. It premiered on BBC Two on 19 September 2022, and was released on Netflix on 31 January 2023.

Plot 
Philomena Cunk (Diane Morgan) travels around the world, interviewing (real-world) experts such as Paul Bahn, Martin Kemp, Nigel Spivey, and Shirley Thompson about world history.

Episodes

Reception 
On Rotten Tomatoes, the series has an approval rating of 100% based on 22 reviews and an average rating of 7.7/10. The site's critical consensus reads, "Diane Morgan feigns dopiness with ingenious comedic timing in Cunk on Earth, a gut-busting sendup of anthropological documentaries." Metacritic, which uses a weighted average, assigned a score of 82 out of 100 based on 8 critics, indicating "universal acclaim".

David Bianculli of NPR gave the series a positive review, stating that it has "cult classic potential". The Hollywood Reporter's Daniel Fienberg called it a "consistently droll, frequently delightful series that mixes high and low comedy at a breakneck pace." Rebecca Nicholson of The Guardian praised Morgan's performance, calling her character "so well-written it's easy to forget she's not real." Michael Idato of The Sydney Morning Herald described the show as "magnificent, brutal, and absurd".

References

External links 
 
 

2022 British television series debuts
2020s British comedy television series
British mockumentary television series
BBC Television shows
BBC television comedy
Television series created by Charlie Brooker
English-language Netflix original programming